Greenfaulds railway station serves the Greenfaulds area of Cumbernauld, North Lanarkshire, Scotland. It is also within walking distance of the Lenziemill industrial estate, the Luggie Water and the Blairlinn industrial estate.

History

The station was opened on 15 May 1989 by British Rail with financial backing from what was then the Strathclyde Passenger Transport Executive.  It was on a new site (though the line that serves it is considerably older) and was built as part of the plan to upgrade the Queen Street to Cumbernauld line. The Motherwell service began calling here when it was inaugurated in May 1996.

Services

2017 

The typical service Monday-Saturday is:

 2tph to Dalmuir via Glasgow Queen Street Low Level and Yoker
 1tph to Dalmuir via Motherwell, Glasgow Central Low Level and Yoker
 1tph to Glasgow Queen Street High Level 
 4tph to Cumbernauld, one of which operates to Camelon and Falkirk Grahamston

On Sundays, there is an hourly service in each direction to Cumbernauld and  only.

There are also two large park and ride car parks at the station with both being behind the station.

2018/19 

From December 2018, a new half hourly Glasgow - Edinburgh via Cumbernauld and Falkirk Grahamston service will start, replacing the hourly DMU service and take over the existing EMU service between Springburn and Cumbernauld. The new service will use new Class 385 EMUs. The service between Cumbernauld and Dalmuir via Motherwell and Glasgow Central will continue to operate with existing stock.

The typical Monday - Saturday service will be:

 2tph to Edinburgh via Cumbernauld and Falkirk Grahamston
 2tph to Glasgow Queen Street High Level
 1tph to Cumbernauld only
 1tph to Dalmuir via Motherwell and Glasgow Central Low Level

References 

 
 

Railway stations in North Lanarkshire
SPT railway stations
Railway stations opened by British Rail
Railway stations in Great Britain opened in 1989
Railway stations served by ScotRail
Cumbernauld
1989 establishments in Scotland